YTR may refer to:

 CFB Trenton, a Canadian military base
 Genetic code for leucine